Terry Price may refer to:

 Terry Price (rugby), Welsh dual-code rugby player
 Terry Price (footballer), English footballer
 Terry Price (golfer), Australian golfer
 Terry L. Price, American philosopher